Seyreh (also Romanized as Şeyreh; also known as Sereh, Seyareh, and Sirah) is a village in Esmailiyeh Rural District, in the Central District of Ahvaz County, Khuzestan Province, Iran. At the 2006 census, its population was 214, in 42 families.

References 

Populated places in Ahvaz County